Bozkurt is a town and a rural district of Denizli Province in the Aegean Region  of Turkey. The population (2000 census) is 11,738 of which 4,589 live in the small town of Bozkurt itself (with the remainder in surrounding countryside). It is quite close to the Lake Acıgöl and the neighboring town of Çardak and İnceler Kasabası

This is high country inland from the Aegean and Mediterranean, and has hot, dry summers and cold, wet winters.

During the Russo-Turkish War (1877–1878) refugees from Bulgaria were settled on the plain, which was then known as Hanabat after a Seljuk Turkish caravanserai that stands within the boundaries of the present-day neighboring district of Çardak. Immigration from Bulgaria continued until recent times.

This is an agricultural district, with irrigation systems currently being constructed.

Karagöl, literally "the black lake", is situated on top of the mountain on the slopes of which the town of Bozkurt is located. Karagöl is at an altitude of 1,250m and is an area of dense forests centered on several small crater lakes which are also fed by streams.

References

Denizli
Populated places in Denizli Province
Districts of Denizli Province